Stony Mountain is a  mountain summit located in Ouray County of southwest Colorado, United States. It is situated five miles southwest of the community of Ouray, on land managed by Uncompahgre National Forest. It is part of the Sneffels Range which is a subset of the San Juan Mountains, which in turn is part of the Rocky Mountains. It is situated west of the Continental Divide, 1.3 miles southwest of Potosi Peak, and 1.15 miles northeast of parent Mount Emma. Yankee Boy Basin is surrounded by Stony Mountain, Gilpin Peak, Mount Sneffels, Cirque Mountain, and Teakettle Mountain. The mountain's name, which has been officially adopted by the United States Board on Geographic Names, was in use before 1899 when Henry Gannett published it in A Dictionary of Altitudes in the United States.

Climate 
According to the Köppen climate classification system, Stony Mountain is located in an alpine subarctic climate zone with cold, snowy winters, and cool to warm summers. Due to its altitude, it receives precipitation all year, as snow in winter, and as thunderstorms in summer, with a dry period in late spring. Precipitation runoff from the mountain drains into tributaries of the Uncompahgre River.

See also

References

External links 

 Weather forecast: National Weather Service

Mountains of Ouray County, Colorado
San Juan Mountains (Colorado)
Mountains of Colorado
North American 3000 m summits
Uncompahgre National Forest